Sir James Alfred Smith CBE, TD was Chief Justice of the Bahamas from 7 July 1978 to 11 May 1980.

References 

Colony of the Bahamas judges
Knights Bachelor
Commanders of the Order of the British Empire
20th-century Bahamian people
Year of birth missing

Year of death missing